The Carmichaels Area School District serves the Borough of Carmichaels and Cumberland Township in Greene County, Pennsylvania. The district is one of the 500 public school districts of Pennsylvania and one of five public school districts in Greene County. According to 2000 federal census data, it served a resident population of 7,120. By 2010, the district's population declined to 7,098 people. In 2009, the district residents’ per capita income was $15,269, while the median family income was $36,276. In the Commonwealth, the median family income was 
$49,501 and the United States median family income was $49,445, in 2010. The educational attainment levels for the population 25 and over were 86.0% high school graduates and 18.6% college graduates.

Carmichaels Area School District operates one elementary school (Carmichaels Area Elementary Center), and one Junior/Senior High School, Carmichaels Area Junior/Senior High School. High school students may choose to attend Greene County Career and Technical Center for training in the construction and mechanical trades. The Intermediate Unit IU1 provides the district with a wide variety of services like specialized education for disabled students and hearing, speech and visual disability services and professional development for staff and faculty.

Extracurriculars
Carmichaels Area School District offers a variety of clubs, activities and an extensive interscholastic sports program.

High school sports
Carmichaels Area High School is a member of the Pennsylvania Interscholastic Athletic Association (PIAA) and the Western Pennsylvania Interscholastic Athletic League (WPIAL). Carmichaels is in PIAA District 7.

Junior high school
Boys:
Basketball
Football

Girls
Basketball
Softball
Volleyball

According to PIAA directory July 2012

References

External links
 Carmichaels Area School District website

School districts in Greene County, Pennsylvania
Greene County, Pennsylvania
Education in Greene County, Pennsylvania